Hello Sister, Goodbye Life is a 2006  ABC Family original comedy-drama television film based on novelist Claire Scovell LaZebnik's book, Same as It Never Was. Starring Lacey Chabert as Olivia, Wendie Malick as Barbara, Adam Kaufman as Joe,  Sammi Hanratty as Celia, David Ramsey as Dennis, Keith Flippen as Mr. Calhoon, Mitch Laurance as Richard, Erin Fisk as Alicia, Amanda Baker as Betsy, Yvette Sirker as Rosivel, and Hunter Whitlow as Yale.

Plot
Olivia, a college student whose whole life changes when her father and stepmother die in an accident and left her to take custody of her half-sister, Celia. Olivia's mother, Barbara, moves into Celia's house and helps Olivia raise her.

External links
 

2006 television films
2006 films
ABC Family original films
American comedy-drama television films
Films based on American novels
Films shot in New Orleans
2006 comedy-drama films
Films directed by Steven Robman
2000s English-language films
2000s American films